Rollinia xylopiifolia is a species of plant in the Annonaceae family. It is endemic to the Atlantic Forest ecoregion of Brazil.

References

xylopiifolia
Endemic flora of Brazil
Flora of the Atlantic Forest
Near threatened flora of South America
Taxonomy articles created by Polbot
Taxobox binomials not recognized by IUCN